Mahuna is a genus of planthoppers belonging to the family Achilidae.

Species
Species:

Mahuna battis 
Mahuna conspersa 
Mahuna nebulosa 
Mahuna obscura 
Mahuna viridicans

References

Achilidae